A stab wound is a specific form of penetrating trauma to the skin that results from a knife or a similar pointed object. While stab wounds are typically known to be caused by knives, they can also occur from a variety of implements, including broken bottles and ice picks. Most stabbings occur because of intentional violence or through self-infliction. The treatment is dependent on many different variables such as the anatomical location and the severity of the injury. Even though stab wounds are inflicted at a much greater rate than gunshot wounds, they account for less than 10% of all penetrating trauma deaths.

Management
Stab wounds can cause various internal and external injuries. They are generally caused by low-velocity weapons, meaning the injuries inflicted on a person are typically confined to the path it took internally, instead of causing damage to surrounding tissue, which is common of gunshot wounds. The abdomen is the most commonly injured area from a stab wound. Interventions that may be needed depending on severity of the injury include airway, intravenous access, and  control of hemorrhage. The length and size of the knife blade, as well as the trajectory it followed, may be important in planning management as it can be a predictor of what structures were damaged. There are also special considerations to take into effect as given the nature of injuries, there is a higher likelihood that persons with these injuries might be under the influence of illicit substances which can make it harder to obtain a complete medical history. Special precautions should also be taken to prevent further injury from a perpetrator to the victim in a hospital setting. Similarly to treating shock, it is important to keep the systolic pressure above 90mmHg, maintain the person's core body temperature, and for prompt transport to a trauma center in severe cases.

To determine if internal bleeding is present a focused assessment with sonography (FAST) or diagnostic peritoneal lavage (DPL) can be used. Other diagnostic tests such as a computed tomography scan or various contrast studies can be used to more definitively classify the injury in both severity and location. Local wound exploration is also another technique that may be utilized to determine how far the object penetrated. Observation can be used in place of surgery as it can substitute an unnecessary surgery, which makes it the preferred treatment of penetrating trauma secondary to a stab wound when hypovolemia or shock is not present. Laboratory diagnostic studies such as a hematocrit, white blood cell count and chemical tests such as liver function tests can also help to determine the efficiency of care.

Surgery
Surgical intervention may be required but it depends on what organ systems are affected by the wound and the extent of the damage. It is important for care providers to thoroughly check the wound site in as much as a laceration of an artery often results in delayed complications sometimes leading to death. In cases where there is no suspicion of bleeding or infection, there is no known benefit of surgery to correct any present injuries. Typically a surgeon will track the path of the weapon to determine the anatomical structures that were damaged and repair any damage they deem necessary. Surgical packing of the wounds is generally not the favored technique to control bleeding as it can be less useful than fixing the directly affected organs. In severe cases when homeostasis cannot be maintained the use of damage control surgery may be utilized.

Epidemiology

Stab wounds are one of the most common forms of penetrating trauma globally, but account for a lower mortality compared to blunt injuries due to their more focused impact on a person. Stab wounds can result from self-infliction, accidental nail gun injuries, and stingray injuries, however, most stab wounds are caused by intentional violence, as the weapons  used to inflict such wounds are readily available compared to guns.  Stabbings are a relatively common cause of homicide in Canada and the United States. Typically death from stab wounds is due to organ failure or blood loss. They are the mechanism of approximately 2% of suicides.

In Canada, homicides by stabbing and gunshot occur relatively equally (1,008 to 980 for the years 2005 to 2009). In the United States guns are a more common method of homicide (9,484 versus 1,897 for stabbing or cutting in 2008).

Stab wounds occur four times more than gunshot wounds in the United Kingdom, but the mortality rate associated with stabbing has ranged from 0-4% as 85% of injuries sustained from stab wounds only affect subcutaneous tissue. Most assaults resulting in a stab wound occur to and by men and persons of ethnic minorities.

History
Some of the first principles of wound care come from Hippocrates who promoted keeping wounds dry except for irrigation. Guy de Chauliac would promote removal of foreign bodies, rejoining of severed tissues, maintenance of tissue continuity, preservation of organ substance, and prevention of complications. The first successful operation on a person who was stabbed in the heart was performed in 1896 by Ludwig Rehn, in what is now considered the first case of heart surgery. In the late 1800s it was hard to treat stab wounds because of poor transportation of victims to health facilities and the low ability for surgeons to effectively repair organs. However, the use of laparotomy, which has been developed a few years earlier, had provided better patient outcomes than had been seen before. After its inception, the use of exploratory laparotomies was highly encouraged for "all deep stab wounds" in which surgeons were to stop active bleeding, repair damage, and remove "devitalized tissues". Because laparotomies were seen to benefit patients, they were used on most every person with an abdominal stab wound until the 1960s when doctors were encouraged to use them more selectivity in favor of observation. During the Korean war, a greater emphasis was put on the use of pressure dressings and tourniquets to initially control bleeding.

See also 

 Ballistic trauma

References

Bibliography

External links 

Injuries
Causes of death